St. Michael's Golden-Domed Monastery is a monastery in Kyiv, the capital of Ukraine, dedicated to Michael the Archangel. It is located on the edge of the bank of the Dnieper, northeast of the Saint Sophia Cathedral. The site is located in the historic administrative Uppertown and overlooks the city's historical commercial and merchant quarter, the Podil. The monastery has been the headquarters of the Orthodox Church of Ukraine since December 2018.

Originally built in the Middle Ages by the Kievan Rus' ruler Sviatopolk II Iziaslavych, the monastery comprises the cathedral church, the Refectory of St. John the Divine, built in 1713, the Economic Gates, constructed in 1760, and the bell tower, which was added in the 1710s. The exterior of the structure was remodelled  in the Ukrainian Baroque style during the 18th century, while the interior kept its original Byzantine architecture. The cathedral was demolished by the Soviet authorities in the 1930s, but was rebuilt following Ukrainian independence in 1991, and opened in 1999.

History

Early years

During the 1050s, Iziaslav I,  the Grand Prince of Kyiv, built a monastery, then called the Monastery and Church of St Demetrius, close to the Saint Sophia Cathedral. Half a century later, his son Sviatopolk II Iziaslavych, commissioned the monastery church, which was dedicated to his father's patron saint, Michael the Archangel. The church may have been built to commemorate Svyatopolk's victory over the Polovtsians, as Michael the Archangel is the patron saint of war victories.

Sviatopolk II was interred in the monastery in 1113, as were other members of his family.

The cathedral domes were probably the first in Kyivan Rus to be gilded. The monastery was damaged during the Mongol invasion in 1240, when the domes were pillaged. The cloister became so ruinous that it was left unmentioned in official records for the next 250 years. By 1496, by which time its name was changed to St. Michael's, the monastery's fortunes had revived.

Restoration and subsequent patronage
After being restored and enlarged during the 16th century, the monastery became one of the most popular and wealthiest in Ukraine. In 1618, the religious figure  tried to extend his power over the monastery, which provoked a sharp reaction: the Cossacks captured him and drowned him in a ditch opposite the Vydubychi Monastery. In 1620, Iov Boretsky made it the residence of the renewed Orthodox metropolitan of Kyiv, and in 1633, Isaya Kopynsky was named a supervisor of the monastery.

The monastery enjoyed the patronage of hetmans and other benefactors throughout the years. The chief magnet for pilgrims were the relics of Saint Barbara, alleged to have been brought to Kyiv from Constantinople in 1108 by Sviatopolk II Iziaslavych's wife and kept in a silver reliquary donated by Hetman Ivan Mazepa. Although most of the monastery grounds were secularized in the late 18th century, as many as 240 monks resided there in the 19th and 20th centuries. The monastery served as the residence of the bishop of Chernigov after 1800. A precentor's school was located on the monastery grounds; many prominent composers, such as Kyrylo Stetsenko and Yakiv Yatsynevych, either studied or taught at the school.

1870s–1930s

In 1870, about 100,000 pilgrims paid tribute to St. Barbara at St. Michael's Monastery. Before the Russian Revolution in 1917, rings manufactured and blessed at St. Michael's Monastery, known as St. Barbara's rings, were very popular among the citizens of Kyiv. They usually served as good luck charms and, according to popular beliefs, occasionally protected against witchcraft but were also effective against serious illnesses and sudden death. These beliefs reference the facts that the Monastery was not affected by the plague epidemics in 1710 and 1770 and cholera epidemics of the 19th century.

In 1906, a medieval hoard of silver and gold jewellery was discovered in a metal casket on Trekhsvyatytelska Street (Street of the Three Saints), opposite the gates of St. Michael's Golden-Domed Monastery. Gold jewellery from the hoard is now in the Metropolitan Museum of Art, New York; the silver jewellery and two ingots are in the British Museum, London. The hoard is dated to the 11th–12th centuries and was probably hidden at the time of the Tartar invasions and the Sack of Kyiv in 1240.

Demolition of the cathedral and bell tower during the Soviet era

Proposals
During the first half of the 1930s, various Soviet publications questioned the known historical facts regarding the age of the Cathedral. The publications stressed that the medieval building had undergone major reconstructions and that little of the original Byzantine-style cathedral was preserved. This wave of questioning justified the demolition of the monastery and its replacement with a new administrative centre for the Ukrainian Soviet Socialist Republic (previously located in the city of Kharkiv). On the basis of their survey, the cathedral was declared to belong primarily to the Ukrainian Baroque style, rather than to the twelfth century as was previously thought, and thus did not merit preservation due to its alleged lack of historical and artistic value. This conclusion backed up the Soviet authorities' plans to demolish the entire monastery. Local historians, archaeologists, and architects agreed to the monastery's demolition, although reluctantly. Only one professor, refused to sign the demolition act; he later died in a Soviet prison.

In the mid-1930s, after the transfer of the Ukrainian capital from Kharkiv to Kyiv, a decision was made to demolish the cathedral and build administrative buildings in its place. For this purpose, in 1934 Soviet authorities decided to hold a competition for the project of the Governmental Centre with a place for parades. In all of the projects submitted for the location in the area of Bogdan Khmelnitsky Square, the St. Michael's Golden-domed Cathedral was demolished, except for one. The project of Joseph Karakis was the only one of four projects submitted for the competition with the location of the centre in this place, in which the St. Michael's Golden-domed Cathedral and the monument to Bogdan Khmelnitsky were preserved. However, at the end of the first round, the project of architect  was selected by the authorities as the most appropriate.

This project, according to the architect , "was repeating the general scheme of the Karakis, but was done in a more frontal approach, with the liquidation of the St. Michael's Golden-Domed Cathedral. And if the location of the main volumes of the Karakis is asymmetric…" In March 1934, authorities decided to abandon the previous decision and announce a new competition, and at the end to choose the project of architect Joseph Langbard.  Meanwhile, according to Oleg Yunakov's research based on archive documents, it is clear that although there is no cathedral in the projects of J. Langbard and P. Yurchenko, that was not the reason for the demolition, since the decision to demolish the monastery was adopted by the resolution of the Politburo in February 1934, and the dismantling of mosaics began to be produced already in 1933.

Removal of the mosaics prior to demolition

On 26 June 1934, work began on the removal of the twelfth-century Byzantine mosaics. It was conducted by the Mosaic Section of the Leningrad Academy of Fine Arts. Specialists were forced to work in haste on account of the impending demolition and were thus unable to complete the entire project. Despite the care and attention shown during the removal of the mosaics from the cathedral's walls, the relocated mosaics cannot be relied upon as being absolutely authentic.

The remaining mosaics, covering an area of 45 square metres (485 sq ft), were apportioned among the State Hermitage Museum, the Tretyakov Gallery, and the State Russian Museum.  The other remaining mosaics were installed on the second floor of the Saint Sophia Cathedral, where they were not on display for tourists. Those items that remained in Kyiv were seized by the Nazis during World War II and taken to Germany. After the war ended, they fell into American hands and were later returned to Moscow.

Demolition (1935–1936)
During the spring of 1935, the golden domes of the monastery were pulled down. The cathedral's silver royal gates, Mazepa's reliquary—weighing two poods of silver—and other valuables were sold abroad or simply destroyed. Master Hryhoryi's five-tier iconostasis was removed (and later destroyed) from the cathedral as well. St. Barbara's relics were transferred to the Church of the Tithes and upon that church's demolition, to the St Volodymyr's Cathedral in 1961.

During the spring-summer period of 1936, the shell of the cathedral and bell tower were blown up with dynamite. The monastery's Economic Gate and the monastic walls were also destroyed. After the demolition, a thorough search for valuables was carried out by the NKVD on the site. The resulting empty plot was joined with Sofiyivska Square, renamed Uryadova Square (Governmental Square) and was designated as the new city centre and parade grounds. Soviet authorities then commissioned a competition how to best fill the empty plot; most architects, including , suggested a huge Lenin statue. The square itself was planned as a rectangle with huge governmental buildings on the perimeter. Four pillars were planned with statues of workers, peasants and revolutionaries with flags standing on them. Some architects suggested demolishing the statue of Bohdan Khmelnytsky in front of the Saint Sophia Cathedral and the Cathedral itself.

The only building completed on the former monastery grounds before World War II currently houses the Ministry of Foreign Affairs. The construction of the second building ("the capital centre"), planned to be built on the site where the Cathedral had once stood, was delayed in the spring of 1938 as the authorities were not satisfied with the submitted design. This building failed to materialize. Some time after demolition, the site where the former cathedral used to be located was transformed into a sport complex, including tennis and volleyball courts. The refectory of St. John the Divine was used for changing rooms.

Reconstruction

In 1973, the Kyiv City Council established several "archaeological preservation zones" within the city; these included the territory surrounding the monastery. However, the vacant site of the demolished cathedral was excluded from the proposed Historic-Archaeological Park-Museum, The Ancient Kyiv, developed by architect A. M. Miletskyi and consultants M. V. Kholostenko and P. P. Tolochko.

During the 1970s, Ukrainian architects I. Melnyk, A. Zayika, V. Korol, and engineer A. Kolyakov worked out a plan of reconstruction of the St. Michael's Monastery. However, these plans were only considered after the fall of the Soviet Union in 1991.

After Ukraine regained independence in 1991, the demolition of the monastery was deemed a crime and voices started to be heard calling for the monastery's full-scale reconstruction as an important part of the cultural heritage of the Ukrainian people. These plans were approved and carried out in 1997–1998, whereupon the cathedral and belltower were transferred to the Ukrainian Orthodox Church – Kyiv Patriarchate. Yuriy Ivakin, the chief archaeologist for the site, said that more than 260 valuable ancient artifacts were recovered during excavations of the site before reconstruction. In addition, a portion of the ancient cathedral, still intact, was uncovered; this today makes up a part of the current cathedral's crypt.

The monastery was recreated with the Baroque additions it had at the time of its destruction. With support of Kyiv City Council, architect-restorer Y. Lositskiy and others restored the western part of the stone walls. The belltower was restored next and became an observation platform. Instead of the original chiming clock, a new electronic one with hands and a set of chimes (a total of 40) was installed from which today the melodies of famous Ukrainian composers can be heard. The Cathedral was reconstructed last and decorated with a set of wooden baroque icons, copies of former mosaics and frescoes, and new works of art by Ukrainian artists.

The newly rebuilt St. Michael's Golden-Domed Cathedral was officially opened on 30 May 1999. However, interior decorations, mosaics, and frescoes were not completed until 28 May 2000. The side chapels were consecrated to Saint Barbara and Saint Catherine of Alexandria in 2001. During the following four years, 18 out of 29 mosaics and other objets d'art from the original cathedral were returned from Moscow after years of tedious discussion between Ukrainian and Russian authorities. However, by the end of 2006, the remaining frescoes of the monastery are going to be transferred from the Hermitage Museum in Saint Petersburg to Kyiv. They are placed in a special preserve that is owned by the municipality rather than the church body.

Headquarters of the Orthodox Church of Ukraine 
The St. Michael's Golden-Domed Monastery became the headquarters of the Orthodox Church of Ukraine after the church's creation on 15 December 2018. St. Michael's Golden-Domed Monastery is used as the headquarters of the Metropolitan of Kyiv and all Ukraine. The rector of the monastery has the rank of diocesan bishop.

:
 Metropolitan of Kyiv and All Ukraine — Epiphanius I of Ukraine

Architecture

Cathedral

The religious architecture of St. Michael's Golden-Domed Monastery incorporates elements that have evolved from styles prevalent during Byzantine and Baroque periods. The St. Michael's Golden-Domed Cathedral is the monastery's main church, built in 1108–1113 at the behest of Sviatopolk II Iziaslavych. The cathedral was the largest of three churches of St. Demetrius Monastery.

It used the Greek cross plan prevalent during the time of the Kyivan Rus, six pillars, and three apses. A miniature church, likely a baptistery, adjoined the cathedral from the south. There was also a tower with a staircase leading to the choir loft; it was incorporated into the northern part of the narthex rather than protruding from the main block as was common at the time. It is likely that the cathedral had a single dome, although two smaller domes might have topped the tower and baptistery. The interior decoration was lavish as its high-quality shimmering mosaics, probably the finest in Kyivan Rus, still testify.

When the medieval churches of Kyiv were rebuilt in the late 17th and early 18th centuries in the Ukrainian Baroque style, the cathedral was enlarged and renovated dramatically. By 1746, it had acquired a new baroque exterior, while maintaining its original Byzantine interior. Six domes were added to the original single dome, but the added pressure on the walls was counteracted by the construction of buttresses. The remaining medieval walls, characterised by alternative layers of limestone and flat brick, were covered with stucco. Ivan Hryhorovych-Barskyi was responsible for window surrounds and stucco ornamentation.
Inside the church, an intricate five-tier icon screen funded by Hetman Pavlo Skoropadsky and executed by Hryhoryi Petriv from Chernigov was installed in 1718. During the 18th and 19th centuries, almost all of the original Byzantine mosaics and frescoes on the interior walls were painted over. Some restoration work on the mosaics and frescoes that remained unpainted was carried out towards the end of the 19th century. However, there were no major and serious investigations of the walls done, so it is possible that medieval frescoes or mosaics were preserved under the newer coats of plaster.

Refectory

In August 1963, the preserved refectory of the demolished monastery without its Baroque cupola was designated a monument of architecture of the Ukrainian SSR. In 1973–1982 restoration of the Refectory Church of St. John the Theologian (the only building that survived the demolition of the 1930s) was held – authors of the project were architect V. Shevchenko and architect I. Karakis (interiors and furniture).

The refectory of St. John the Divine is a rectangular brick building which contains a dining hall for the brethren as well as several kitchens and pantries. The Church of John the Theologian adjoins it from the east. The outside is segmented by pilasters and displays window surrounds reminiscent of traditional Eastern Orthodox church architecture. The refectory was erected in 1713, taking the place of the original wooden refectory. Its interior was overhauled in 1827 and 1837 and the restoration work was undertaken from 1976 to 1981.

Notes

References

Sources

Further reading

External links

 
*  — information about the relics of Saint Barbara
 Information about the monastery from MD-Ukraine

 
Religious buildings and structures in Kyiv
Monasteries of the Orthodox Church of Ukraine
Christian monasteries established in the 12th century
Demolished Christian monasteries in Ukraine
Rebuilt buildings and structures in Ukraine
Churches of the Orthodox Church of Ukraine
Church buildings with domes
Tourist attractions in Kyiv
Baroque architecture in Ukraine
Shevchenkivskyi District, Kyiv